Frances Gertrude Claire D'Souza, Baroness D'Souza,  (née Russell; born 18 April 1944) is a British scientist and politician. She held the office of Lord Speaker from 1 September 2011 to 31 August 2016.

Early life, education and early career
Frances Gertrude Claire Russell, the daughter of Robert Anthony Gilbert and Pauline (née Parmet) Russell, was educated at St Mary's School, Princethorpe, and went to University College London to read anthropology, graduating BSc in 1970. She subsequently undertook further study at Lady Margaret Hall, Oxford, obtaining the degree of Doctor of Philosophy (D.Phil.) in 1976. She worked for the Nuffield Institute of Brain Chemistry and Human Nutrition from 1973 to 1977, Oxford Polytechnic (now Oxford Brookes University) from 1977 to 1980, and was an independent research consultant for the United Nations from 1985 to 1988. From 1989 to 2002, she was the director of the human rights organization Article 19. As its representative she supported the Musa Anter peace train to Diyarbakır, which aimed for peace in Kurdistan.

Personal life
In 1959, when she was 15, she married Dr Stanislaus Joseph D'Souza, with whom she had two children; they divorced in 1974. From 1985 to 1994 she was married to Martin John Griffiths. In 2003 she and D'Souza remarried. Their elder daughter is the journalist Christa D'Souza.

Honours
D'Souza was invested as a Companion of the Order of St Michael and St George in 1999.

House of Lords
D'Souza was created a Lord Temporal as Baroness D'Souza, of Wychwood in the County of Oxfordshire, on 1 July 2004. She sat as a crossbencher in the House of Lords, where she was the Convenor of the Crossbench Peers from 2007 to 2011 with attendance "well above average".

On 13 July 2011, D'Souza was elected Lord Speaker of the House of Lords and began her new role in September 2011.

In December 2015, the results of a Freedom of Information request revealed that D'Souza spent £230 to keep a chauffeured car waiting while she watched a performance of Benjamin Britten's Gloriana with the chairman of the Federation Council of Russia. The journey was just a mile from the Houses of Parliament. She spent £270 holding a car for four and a half hours while she had lunch with the Japanese ambassador in central London. It was also revealed that a 10-day official trip to Japan, Hong Kong and Taiwan in the autumn of last year cost nearly £26,000, and that she had spent £4,000 across a five-year period on fresh flowers for her office at the taxpayer's expense.

D'Souza's term as Lord Speaker ended on 31 August 2016. After returning to the crossbenches she called for urgent action to address the growing size of the House of Lords, including limits on the Prime Minister's patronage power.

References

External links

Baroness D'Souza on parliament.uk

 

1944 births
Living people
People educated at Princethorpe College
Alumni of University College London
Alumni of Lady Margaret Hall, Oxford
People from Sussex
People from Warwickshire
People from Oxfordshire
Academics of Oxford Brookes University
Companions of the Order of St Michael and St George
Crossbench life peers
Members of the Privy Council of the United Kingdom
People's peers
Lords Speaker
Life peeresses created by Elizabeth II